Transilien Line N is a railway line of the Paris Transilien suburban rail network operated by the SNCF. The line has a total of 117,000 passengers per weekday. Passenger service started in 2004.

Rolling stock 
As of October 2022, the following trains are operated on the line : SNCF Class Z 57000 (Regio 2N), and occasionally SNCF Class Z 8800.

Rambouillet Line

This line, according to SNCF, will travel from start to the terminus in 1 hour, and operates as per this route, on the Paris–Brest railway:
Gare Montparnasse
Vanves–Malakoff station
Clamart station
Meudon station
Bellevue station
Sèvres-Rive-Gauche station
Chaville-Rive-Gauche station
Viroflay-Rive-Gauche station
Versailles-Chantiers station
Saint-Cyr station
Saint-Quentin-en-Yvelines–Montigny-le-Bretonneux station
Trappes station
La Verrière station
Coignières station
Les Essarts-le-Roi station
Le Perray station
Rambouillet station

This line is electrified using a 1500 V direct current.

Dreux Line
This line according to SNCF will get from start to terminus in 1hr, and operates as per this route, on the Paris–Brest railway up to Saint-Cyr, then on the :
same route as the Rambouillet line between Paris-Montparnasse and Saint-Cyr
Fontenay-le-Fleury station
Villepreux–Les-Clayes station
Plaisir–Les-Clayes station
Plaisir–Grignon station
Villiers–Neauphle–Pontchartrain station
Montfort-l'Amaury–Méré station
Garancières–La Queue station
Orgerus–Béhoust station
Tacoignières–Richebourg station
Houdan station
Leave Île-de-France
Marchezais–Broué station
Dreux station

This line is electrified using a 1500 V direct current between the Montparnasse station and the Plaisir-Grignon station, and a 25000 V alternating current elsewhere.

Mantes-la-Jolie Line
same route as the Dreux line between Paris-Montparnasse and Plaisir - Grignon, on the Paris–Brest railway up to Saint-Cyr, then on the  up to Plaisir, then on the  up to Épône - Méziéres, and finally on the Paris–Le Havre railway:
Beynes station
Mareil-sur-Mauldre station
Maule station
Nézel–Aulnay station
Épône–Mézières station
Mantes-la-Jolie station

This line is electrified using a 1500 V direct current between the Montparnasse station and the Plaisir-Grignon station, and a 25000 V alternating current elsewhere.

Names of service
Like other Transilien lines the name of service consists of four letters, but is not always displayed on trains, but it can be seen on passenger information display systems.

Taking GEPU (which is for a train that runs express between Paris-Montparnasse and Sèvres-Rive-Gauche then stops all stations to Plaisir-Grignon) as an example, the table describes how names of services are structured.

There is also codes given to Chartres TER services, which are PACE towards Paris-Montparnasse, and CAPO towards Chartres.

See also
 List of Transilien stations

References

External links 
  Transilien Paris – Montparnasse on the Transilien website

Transilien